How She Triumphed was a 1911 American short silent romantic drama film directed by D. W. Griffith and starring Blanche Sweet. The film is now considered lost.

Cast
 Blanche Sweet as Mary
 Vivian Prescott as Mary's Cousin
 Joseph Graybill as The Sweetheart
 Kate Bruce
 Florence La Badie
 Charles West

See also
 D. W. Griffith filmography
 Blanche Sweet filmography

References

External links

1911 films
1911 romantic drama films
1911 lost films
1911 short films
American romantic drama films
American silent short films
Biograph Company films
American black-and-white films
Films directed by D. W. Griffith
Films shot in California
Lost American films
Lost romantic drama films
1910s American films
Silent romantic drama films
Silent American drama films
1910s English-language films
English-language drama films